Katie Marie McClure (born March 14, 1998) is an American professional soccer player who most recently played as a forward for Angel City of the National Women's Soccer League (NWSL).

Club career

Washington Spirit
McClure made her NWSL debut in the 2020 NWSL Challenge Cup on July 1, 2020.

Racing Louisville
On November 12, 2020, McClure was chosen by Racing Louisville FC in the 2020 NWSL Expansion Draft. In the following season, she scored the winning penalty kick against the Chicago Red Stars in The Women's Cup semifinal, and her first NWSL goal against the Orlando Pride on October 16.

Following the 2021 season, Racing stated that McClure was departing the club.

References

External links
 Kansas profile
 Washington Spirit profile
 Racing Louisville profile

1998 births
Living people
American women's soccer players
Soccer players from Wichita, Kansas
Women's association football forwards
Kansas Jayhawks women's soccer players
Washington Spirit draft picks
Washington Spirit players
National Women's Soccer League players
Racing Louisville FC players